Stained Glass Scarlet (real name Scarlet Fasinera) is a fictional character appearing in American comic books published by Marvel Comics. The character was created by Doug Moench, Bill Sienkiewicz, and Jim Shooter.

Publication history
Scarlet made her debut in December 1981 in Moon Knight #14. She re-appeared several times in the series thereafter.

She returned in Marc Spector: Moon Knight #26 (May 1991), for a 5-part story titled Scarlet Redemption which ran until Marc Spector: Moon Knight #30 (September 1991). 

She featured in the 1998 Moon Knight miniseries which was written by her co-creator Doug Moench.

She also appeared in the All-New Official Handbook of the Marvel Universe #10 (October 2006),Civil War Battle Damage Report #1 (March 2007).  and the Official Handbook of the Marvel Universe A-Z #11 (January 2010).

Fictional character biography
Stained Glass Scarlet is an ex-nun who became a vigilante after being forced to kill her criminal son. Scarlet was trained in combat when she became a prison guard in a women's prison. 

Abused by her father, Scarlet had an unhappy childhood. One evening when she had had enough of it, she killed her father, by lighting his bed with a cigarette. His death was considered an accident and she was sent to live with her uncle and aunt, where her living conditions were improved. 

Later in life, she met and married Vince Fasinera, a small-time criminal, believing that she could save him from himself.  She was wrong, and he simply mistreated her, much like her father had. Despite this, they had a child together, Joseph, though Vince wanted nothing to do with him. Vince later died, gunned down on the steps of a church, and their son turned to a life of crime himself. He was later called Joseph "Mad Dog" Fasinera.
 
When he escaped prison, Scarlet took it upon herself to save her son from his life of crime, but in the end she was forced to kill him. Scarlet turned into a vigilante and started hunting down all the criminals who had ever had a hand to play in her son's turning to crime. Moon Knight tried to stop her, but ended up letting her escape.

Scarlet Redemption

Scarlet returns and haunts the streets of Brooklyn armed with her crossbow. She finds Bertrand Crawley and, recognizing him as a friend of Marc Spector (or Jake Lockley), fires a crossbow bolt into his shoulder. Crawley runs off and falls through the glass front door of Gena's Diner. Scarlet follows after him, firing several more shots into the diner. She pitches Gena Landers through a window then fires a shot into the oven's gas lines, causing the entire building to explode. Scarlet returns to the church where she lives, confident that her "sweet angel" will come for her.

That evening, Marc stands before the Statue of Khonshu. He suddenly sees an image of Scarlet flash before his eyes. He knows that Scarlet is destined to come back into his life. He soon learns about the incident at Gena's Diner. He visits Gena and Crawley in the hospital and promises Gena that he will rebuild the diner. When he leaves the hospital and goes to the Bronx Memorial Cemetery, a group of nuns, all answering to Scarlet, emerge from the shadows and attack him. Scarlet appears and fires a crossbow bolt that tears a hole through Moon Knight's mask. As quickly as she came, she disappears again.

Scarlet later returned, having somehow formed a psychic link to Moon Knight. She was fighting inner demons, and began fire-bombing New York. Moon Knight caught up with her atop a bridge, but she jumped, and he was unable to find her in the waters below. At the time it was unknown whether she survived or not.

The Resurrection War

Scarlet aids the apparently-resurrected Moon Knight in fighting an alliance of some of his oldest foes: Raoul Bushman, Black Spectre and Morpheus, although her willingness to kill continues to put her at odds with Moon Knight. After preventing her from killing a defeated Black Spectre and before his final showdown with Bushman and Morpheus, Moon Knight urges her to flee the scene before the police arrive and she is last seen returning to her church, her escape aided by Ray and Ricky Landers: Gena's children and allies of Moon Knight.

Civil War

In the aftermath of the superhero Civil War, Scarlet is among the names listed as a potential recruit for the 50-States Initiative in the appendix of Tony Stark's battle damage report.

Powers and abilities
While Scarlet does not have any apparent powers, she possesses a mysterious psychic bond with Moon Knight. This psychic bond is not systematic. It appears when Stained Glass Scarlet concentrates on Moon Knight, and can manifest in the form of dreams during which their thoughts intermingle and allow them to briefly communicate. This bond between Stained Glass Scarlet and Moon Knight could be due to an entity close to the Egyptian god of the moon, Khonshu, and reincarnated as Stained Glass Scarlet.

Scarlet is an expert in martial arts. She is able to wield bayonets, guns, and crossbows with precision.

References

External links
 Stained Glass Scarlet at Marvel Wiki

Characters created by Bill Sienkiewicz
Characters created by Doug Moench
Characters created by Jim Shooter
Comics characters introduced in 1981
Marvel Comics martial artists
Marvel Comics female superheroes
Marvel Comics female supervillains